The Stalls of Barchester is the first of the BBC's A Ghost Story for Christmas strand, first broadcast on BBC 1 at 11.00pm on 24 December 1971. Based on the story "The Stalls of Barchester Cathedral" from the 1911 collection More Ghost Stories by M. R. James, it was adapted, produced and directed by Lawrence Gordon Clark.

Plot
Whilst cataloguing the library of Barchester Cathedral in 1932, a scholar, Dr Black (Clive Swift) is shown a box containing a 50-year-old diary (sealed under the order of the Dean) detailing the events leading up to the mysterious death of Dr Haynes (Robert Hardy), a former Archdeacon of the cathedral. From the diary, Dr Black is able to piece together how the murder of Haynes' agéd predecessor, a 17th-century carving on the cathedral choir stalls and the appearance of a large black cat ultimately cursed the former archdeacon. It is implied that Dr Haynes caused the death of his aged predecessor, and therefore falls under the curse of 'Austin the Twice-Born', a carver who made the wooden decorations (the Devil, death and a black cat) of the Cathedral's Archdeacon's stall from oak brought from a nearby wood and from a tree known locally as 'The Hanging Oak'.

Cast
The cast includes several actors now better known for their roles in situation comedies, or lighter dramas.
Clive Swift as Dr. Black
Will Leighton as the cathedral librarian
Robert Hardy as Dr. Haynes
Thelma Barlow as Letitia Haynes
Harold Bennett as Archdeacon Pulteney
Erik Chitty as the priest
David Pugh as John
Ambrose Coghill as museum curator

Production

In adapting the story for film, Clark set the story of the Archdeacon within the frame narrative of Dr Black's discovery of his diary, and the scholar's subsequent investigation into the origin of the carvings. Unlike the original story, the supernatural elements are shown, as opposed to being implied by the diary, albeit in shadowy glimpses. The adaptation was filmed on location at Norwich Cathedral and the surrounding cathedral close. Unusually for a BBC television drama of the 1970s, both interior and exteriors in The Stalls of Barchester were originated on 16 mm film, as opposed to the standard studio videotape for interiors. As a result of this, cameraman John McGlashan was able to make use of night shoots in dark, shadowy cloisters and rooms. The choir of Norwich Cathedral is featured during the scenes of the Anglican Evensong service, and the Nunc dimittis ("Lord, thou lettest now thy servant depart in peace") and Psalm 109 ("Let his days be few; and let another take his office") are used as a storytelling device.

References

External links
 
 

Adaptations of works by M. R. James
BBC television dramas
Television shows based on short fiction
A Ghost Story for Christmas